The Dyecrete Process is a method of adding dye to permanently color concrete.

Types of pigments
Depending on its origin, a concrete colourant can be mineral or organic, and the method of production determines whether it belongs to the natural or artificial class. The respective type of raw material is subjected to thermal or mechanical treatment, resulting in a classic powder or emulsion form dye, microcapsule.
The most resistant formulation is acid (for both interior and exterior applications). In this case, the concrete can take almost any shade - from pure black to blue-green. The acid pigment is able to penetrate deep into the structure of the concrete mass, so the colour of the product does not fade or wear off.
Wear-resistant epoxy paints are often used to paint floors. Acrylic paints are used as an alternative to acid paint for interior and exterior finishes. Latex paints are flexible and resistant to temperature fluctuations and can mask small cracks in the concrete surface.

References

Cited in the Academic Press Dictionary of Science and Technology.
McGraw-Hill Dictionary of Scientific and Technical Terms, published by The McGraw-Hill Companies, Inc.

Concrete